Mark Ramos Nishita (born February 10, 1960), known professionally as Money Mark, is an American producer and musician, best known for his collaborations with the Beastie Boys from 1992 until 2011.

Early life
Born in Detroit to a Japanese-Hawaiian father and a Chicano mother, Nishita moved with his family to Los Angeles, California when he was six.

Career
His first album Mark's Keyboard Repair (1995), was made up of keyboard driven pop-funk songs recorded at demo quality. Guy Ritchie used a song from the album in Lock Stock and Two Smoking Barrels. This was followed up by the Third Version EP in 1996 and Push the Button in 1998, for which Mark received critical praise. Whereas his 1996 EP was similar to his debut, Push the Button was extremely eclectic, combining aspects of rock music and pop with soul, funk and hip hop. This LP was met with good reviews, as was his 2001 follow up Change is Coming which had a tropical yet danceable disco and funk sound.

Mark met the Beastie Boys during their migration to the West Coast, through mutual friend Mario Caldato Jr., who asked Mark (who was working as a carpenter) to fix the wooden gate at the entrance of the property where the band were staying when they were recording Paul's Boutique. He helped them build a studio, and quickly became a principal collaborator. He performed, wrote, and collaborated on every Beastie Boys album from 1992's Check Your Head to the group's final album, 2011's Hot Sauce Committee Part Two. Mark co-authored the Grammy Award winning album The Mix-Up.

Money Mark contributed the keyboard phrase that opens and underpins "Where It's At" from Beck's 1996 album, Odelay. He played keyboards on tour for the Omar Rodriguez-Lopez Quintet in support of their self-titled album. He has since become a full member of the quintet, appearing on the live EP with Damo Suzuki called Please Heat This Eventually and several other albums, with his debut full-length collaboration with the group being the Quintet's second LP release, The Apocalypse Inside of an Orange. In 1996, Money Mark contributed the song "Use Your Head (Use A Sua Cabeca)" to the AIDS benefit album Red Hot + Rio produced by the Red Hot Organization. He also contributed songs to Red Hot's Silencio=Muerte: Red Hot + Latin and Red Hot + Rhapsody a tribute to George Gershwin. In 2004 Mark scored and played all instruments for HBO's first ever documentary prime time series, "Family Bond's," directed by Steve Santor. In that same year, Mark also contributed original songs and score cues for "Along Came Polly," "Fun With Dick and Jane," and "The Devil Wears Prada."

In September 2006, Money Mark signed to Jack Johnson's Brushfire Records label. Brand New By Tomorrow, his first album with Brushfire, was released in February 2007. In late 2006, he opened for Gnarls Barkley at the Riviera Theatre in Chicago. In 2007, Money Mark and The Woodrow Jackson Orchestra recorded a cover version of Love Unlimited Orchestra's "Love's Theme" for Engine Room Recordings' compilation album Guilt by Association. Money Mark composed original music for the 2008 documentary film Beautiful Losers. Mark scored and played all instruments for HBO's first ever documentary prime time series, "Family Bond's," directed by Steve Santor.

In 2011, he contributed the Mario C. Remix of "Tropicaliá" with Beck and Seu Jorge, and played Hammond B-3 organ on "Look Around" from the Red Hot Chili Peppers album I'm With You, as well as a version of the song "Tropical Affair" with Thalma de Freitas and João Parahyba for Red Hot Organization's most recent charitable album "Red Hot+Rio 2." The album is a follow-up to the 1996 "Red Hot + Rio." Proceeds from the sales will be donated to raise awareness and money to fight AIDS/HIV and related health and social issues.

Mark scored the Slamdance Audience Award- winning and critically acclaimed documentary film, Getting Up: The Tempt One Story.

Money Mark, working with Mike McCready and Stefan Lessard, contributed to many of the tracks used in the soundtrack to the 2011 film Horrible Bosses.

He performed in 2011 with Karen O on her pop opera Stop the Virgens.

Over the course of his career, Mark has done recording sessions with the Rolling Stones, Iggy Pop, Nile Rodgers, Yoko Ono, Carlos Santana, Lee Scratch Perry, and Jorge Ben, Dangermouse, Moby, Mixmaster Mike, the Yeah Yeah Yeahs, Red Hot Chili Peppers, Seu Jorge, Jack Johnson, The Mars Volta.

He was a regular guest on DVDASA, a podcast hosted by David Choe and Asa Akira. He is also part of the band Mangchi with David Choe and Steven Lee.

In the spring of 2016, it was announced that Money Mark would be touring with The Claypool Lennon Delirium, a collaboration between Les Claypool and Sean Lennon. From the Prawn Song Newsletter, "Les Claypool and Sean Lennon’s newly formed band The Claypool Lennon Delirium will hit the road this summer for an extensive tour of the United States. Rounding out the band with Les and Sean will be Money Mark on keyboards and Paulo Baldi on drums. In addition to playing Bonnaroo, Vertex and Peach festivals, The Claypool Lennon Delirium will play a number of headline shows across the country."

On July 31, 2020, he was featured on Linkin Park frontman Mike Shinoda’s third studio album, Dropped Frames, Vol. 2, on the track “Isolation Bird.”

Solo discography

Studio albums
Mark's Keyboard Repair (1995, Mo' Wax)
Push the Button (1998, Mo' Wax)
Change Is Coming (2001)
Father Demo Square (2005, Rush! Production)
Brand New by Tomorrow (2007, Brushfire Records)
Stand Up for Your Rice! (2007, Rush! Production)
Songs from Studio D (2011, Rush! Production)

Live albums
Mark on the Mike (1998, Toy's Factory)

Extended plays
Performing Chicken EP (1994, Fido Speaks Music/Love Kit Records)
Legitimate Pop Songs? - Money Mark Live at Rough Trade (1996, Mo' Wax)
Third Version EP (1996, Mo' Wax)
Love Stains: A Demo (2002)
Demo? Or Demolition? EP (2004, Chocolate Industries)

Singles
 "Insects Are All Around Us" / "Cry" (1995)
 "Cry" (1995)
 "Hand in Your Head" (1998)
 "Maybe I'm Dead" (1998)
 "Burn Away" (2005)
 "Pick Up the Pieces" (2006)

Compilations
 "Spiders" Dimension Mix: A Tribute to Dimension 5 Records - Eenie Meenie Records (2005)

Releases on Mo' Wax
 MW 034 LP Mark's Keyboard Repair LP
 MW 090 Push The Button LP
 MW 090 LP Push The Button LP (One 12", One 10" & One 7")
 MW 032 Insects Are All Around Us / Cry 7"
 MW 036 Cry 12"
 MW 032 P Album Sampler 10"
 MW 043 DJ Third Version 7" (Promo)
 MW 043 MLP Third Version EP 10" (Mini Album)
 MW 044 Legitimate Pop Songs? - Money Mark Live At Rough Trade 7"
 MW 066 Hand In Your Head 12"
 MW 066 DJ Cry (Dust Brothers Remix) / Got My Hand In Your Head (New Mix) 10" (Promo)
 MW 066 DJ2 Hand In Your Head 12" (Promo)
 MW 089 Maybe I'm Dead 12"
 MW 089 DJ Maybe I'm Dead 12" (White Label Promo)
 MW 089 S Maybe I'm Dead 7" (Ltd 7" Shaped Chihuahua)

Collaboration discography
With the Beastie Boys
Check Your Head (1992)
Ill Communication (1994)
Hello Nasty (1998)
The Mix-Up (2007)
Hot Sauce Committee Part Two (2011)

With Banyan
Banyan (1997)

With Danger Doom
The Mouse and the Mask (2005)

With Omar Rodriguez Lopez Group
Please Heat This Eventually (2006)
Se Dice Bisonte, No Búfalo (2007)
Omar Rodriguez-Lopez & Lydia Lunch (2007)
The Apocalypse Inside of an Orange (2007)
Calibration (Is Pushing Luck and Key Too Far) (2007)

With Hello Seahorse!
Lejos. No tan Lejos (2010)

With Big Sir
Und Die Scheiße Ändert Sich Immer (2006)
Before Gardens After Gardens (2012)

With the John Butler Trio
Grand National (2007)

With Nação Zumbi
 Track "Assustado", from album Fome de Tudo (2007)

With Joseph D'Anvers
Kids (2008)

With Yo Gabba Gabba
Robodancing (2008)

With Kinky
Those Girls (2009)

With Shawn Lee and Tommy Guerrero
Lord Newborn and The Magic Skulls (2009)

With Red Hot Chili Peppers
I'm With You (2011)

With Linkin Park
Recharged (2012)

With Halo Orbit
Halo Orbit (2016)

With The Claypool Lennon Delirium
The Monolith Of Phobos (2016)

With Molotov
Unplugged (2018)

With TT
LoveLaws (2018)

References

External links
 
 [ Money Mark] at Allmusic
 "Live from SXSW 2007" on 89.3 The Current
 Money Mark NAMM Oral History Interview (2009)

Living people
Beastie Boys
Brushfire Records artists
20th-century American keyboardists
American organists
American male organists
Record producers from California
Record producers from Michigan
American musicians of Japanese descent
Atomic Bomb! Band members
20th-century American pianists
American male pianists
21st-century American keyboardists
21st-century organists
1960 births